The World Cup Taekwondo Team Championships began in 2006, and is held every two years by World Taekwondo.

The participating male and female teams are divided into five groups each and the top four countries at the previous championship and the host country are seeded. Top five teams and three best-record teams among the second-placed teams in the men’s and women’s division of the preliminary round advance to the quarterfinal round. The quarterfinal, semifinal and final matches are conducted in a single elimination format.

Summary

Men

Women

Mixed

Medal table

See also
World Taekwondo Championships

References
World Taekwondo Federation

 
Taekwondo competitions